Nisrin Barwari (or Nesreen Barwari, born 1967) is an Iraqi politician of Kurdish origin who acted as Iraqi Minister for Municipalities and Public Works following the US occupation of Iraq in 2003.

Early life and education
Barwari was born in Baghdad to a Kurdish family and was imprisoned at age fourteen due to her brother's involvement with the Kurdish movement. She obtained a Bachelor of Science in architectural engineering at the University of Baghdad in 1991. Following the 1991 Gulf War, Barwari fled to Turkey as a displaced person.

She served with the United Nations local office in Iraqi Kurdistan from 1991 to 1998. After obtaining a master of public administration at the Harvard Kennedy School in 1999, she served as minister of reconstruction and development in KRG until 2003.

Political activities 
Barwari was appointed Iraq's Minister for Municipalities and Public Works in September 2003, the only woman out of 25 ministers on the Iraqi Governing Council.  In June 2004, she was reappointed minister in the Iraqi Transitional Government. In January 2005 she was elected to the Iraq National Assembly, but resigned her membership to continue as minister.

Berwari has displayed concern for the rights of women in Iraq. In January 2004, she joined protests against Resolution 137 of the Iraqi Governing Council that would have curtailed women's rights by making Iraq's personal status law subject to religious doctrine. During her time as minister in Baghdad she survived several assassination attempts.

Academia 
In 2006, Barwari took a year out of Iraqi politics to study at Harvard Kennedy School. She also has a PhD in Spatial Planning from the University of Dortmund. 

Barwari is an associate professor at the University of Duhok. She is a Planning Steering Committee member of the Duhok governorate and a representative of FWE, an NGO focusing on humanitarian assistance to displaced Iraqi and Syrian refugees into the KRG. Barwari also writes and researches on Iraq's political economy for the LSE.

Barwari has a company manufacturing edible products made from apples grown in the Duhok region.

References

External links 
Nisrin Barwari interview with Inclusive Security (2010).

1967 births
Living people
Kurdish people
21st-century Kurdish women politicians
People from Baghdad
Harvard Kennedy School alumni
University of Baghdad alumni
21st-century Iraqi women politicians
21st-century Iraqi politicians
Iraqi Kurdish women
Government ministers of Iraq
Members of the Council of Representatives of Iraq
Iraqi expatriates in the United States
Women government ministers of Iraq